Frank Dane was a British actor of the silent era.

Dane was born Frank Hughbert Thomas Crust on 7 June 1885 in Deal, Kent. He died in 1957 at age 71 in Chichester, Sussex.

Selected filmography
 A Daughter of England (1915)
 Justice (1917)
 Democracy (1918)
 Hindle Wakes (1918)
 The Romance of Lady Hamilton (1919)
 Lorna Doone (1920)
 Uncle Dick's Darling (1920)
 The Black Tulip (1921)
 Blood Money (1921)
 Innocent (1921)
 Silent Evidence (1922)
 Creation (1922)
 I Pagliacci (1923)
 The Hoosier Schoolmaster (1924)

References

External links

1885 births
1957 deaths
English male stage actors
English male film actors
English male silent film actors
20th-century English male actors
People from Deal, Kent
20th-century British male actors